Głęboczyca massacre was a mass murder of ethnic Poles carried out on 29 August 1943 by the troops of the Ukrainian Insurgent Army aided by the Ukrainian peasants. It exclusively targeted Polish inhabitants of the Głęboczyca colony, located in the Włodzimierz County (powiat włodzimierski) of the Wołyń Voivodeship in the Second Polish Republic (now, part of Volodymyr-Volynskyi Raion, north of Volodymyr, Ukraine). About 250 Poles were killed, including 199 known by name including women and children. Głęboczyce does not exist anymore. It was swept from existence during the Massacres of Poles in Volhynia and Eastern Galicia, along with the neighbouring settlement of Ostrówek in powiat Luboml.

References

1943 crimes in Poland
August 1943 events
Massacres in 1943
Massacres in Poland
Massacres in Ukraine
War crimes committed by the Ukrainian Insurgent Army
Massacres of Poles in Volhynia